Lupin the Third Part II, also known as Shin Lupin III or simply as Lupin III for the American market, is a Japanese anime series based on the manga by Monkey Punch and is produced by Tokyo Movie Shinsha. The third season, which contains 52 episodes, aired between October 2, 1978 and October 1, 1979 on NTV. Twenty-six episodes of English adaptation of the anime aired on Adult Swim starting on January 13, 2003, while episode 79 (the 28th episode of the third season) was the last episode to be released dubbed into English. The opening theme is Theme from Lupin III '79 by Yuji Ohno, while the ending theme is Love Squall by Sandii Hohn.


Episode list

Notes

References
Specific

General

1978 Japanese television seasons
1979 Japanese television seasons
Lupin the Third Part II Season 3